Hongyipao was the Chinese name for European-style muzzle-loading culverins introduced to China and Korea from the Portuguese colony of Macau and by the Hendrick Hamel expedition to Joseon in the early 17th century.

Name
The term "red barbarian cannon" derives from the weapons' supposed Dutch origins, as the Dutch were called "red haired barbarians" in southern China. However, the cannons were originally produced by the Portuguese at Macau, with the exception of two cannons dredged up from a Dutch ship in 1621. The Dutch ship may have been in fact an English ship and the cannons had English coats of arms. The English ship Unicorn sank near Macau.

The Jurchens renamed the "red barbarian cannon" to "red coat cannon" when it entered their arsenal because they found the term "barbarian" to be insulting, and were known as such in the Manchu Eight Banners.

History

Breech loading swivel cannons from Portugal entered the Chinese weaponry after a Ming fleet defeated the Portuguese at the Battle of Xicaowan in 1521 and captured their guns as war booty. However it's possible that individuals in China had been able to purchase Portuguese style cannons even earlier from pirates.

After the Ming dynasty suffered a series of defeats against the Later Jin, they contacted the Portuguese in Macau to have iron cannons made for them. Attempts were made to bring Portuguese gunners to the north as well, but they were repeatedly turned away because Chinese officials harbored suspicions against them. Yu Zigao, commander of Zhejiang and Fujian, ordered several "red-barbarian cannon" in 1624 prior to his expedition against the Dutch outpost on Penghu Island in the Pescadores.

The Ming dynasty used Fujianese to reverse engineer salvaged British and Dutch cannons they recovered from the sea. At the Siege of Fort Zeelandia, Koxinga deployed powerful cannon his uncle had dredged up years earlier from the sea.

Several Ming officials who supported the use of the new technology were Christian converts of the Jesuit mission, such as the influential minister Xu Guangqi and Sun Yuanhua in Shandong. The Tianqi Emperor asked a German Jesuit, Johann Adam Schall von Bell, to establish a foundry in Beijing to cast the new cannons. The first pieces produced there could throw a forty-pound shot. In 1623 some hongyipao were deployed to China's northern frontier at Sun's request under generals such as Sun Chengzong and Yuan Chonghuan. They were used to repel Nurhaci at the Battle of Ningyuan in 1626. The manufacture and use of the hongyipao within the Later Jin Banner armies were carried out by Han Chinese defectors called  (heavy troops). The Jurchen forces did not manufacture nor wield the guns themselves. The Later Jin army under Nurhaci's son Hong Taiji used these cannons along with the "generalissimo" cannons (also of European design) to great effect at the Battle of Dalinghe in 1631. Even after the later Jin became the Qing and Jurchens and Han defectors were reorganized into the Manchu Eight Banners, cannons and gunpowder weapons were still restricted exclusively to the Han Banners while the Manchu Banners avoided them. Han Bannermen specializing in artillery and muskets played a major role during Qing sieges of Ming fortifications.

By the 1680s, the Hongyipao had lost their place as the strongest weapons in the Qing arsenal, and were superseded by another type of cannon called the "miraculous-power general cannon."

Chinese improvements
Chinese gunsmiths continued to modify "red barbarian" cannons after they entered the Ming arsenal, and eventually improved upon them by applying native casting techniques to their design. In 1642, Ming foundries merged their own casting technology with European cannon designs to create a distinctive cannon known as the "Dingliao grand general." Through combining the advanced cast-iron technique of southern China and the iron-bronze composite barrels invented in northern China, the Dingliao grand general cannons exemplified the best of both iron and bronze cannon designs. Unlike traditional iron and bronze cannons, the Dingliao grand general's inner barrel was made of iron, while the exterior of brass.

The resulting bronze-iron composite cannons were superior to iron or bronze cannons in many respects. They were lighter, stronger, longer lasting, and able to withstand more intensive explosive pressure. Chinese artisans also experimented with other variants such as cannons featuring wrought iron cores with cast iron exteriors. While inferior to their bronze-iron counterparts, these were considerably cheaper and more durable than standard iron cannons. Both types were met with success and were considered "among the best in the world" during the 17th century. The Chinese composite metal casting technique was effective enough that Portuguese imperial officials sought to employ Chinese gunsmiths for their cannon foundries in Goa, so that they could impart their methods for Portuguese weapons manufacturing. According to the soldier Albrecht Herport, who fought for the Dutch at the Siege of Fort Zeelandia, the Chinese "know how to make very effective guns and cannons, so that it’s scarcely possible to find  their equal elsewhere."

Soon after the Ming started producing the composite metal Dingliao grand generals in 1642, Beijing was captured by the Manchu Qing dynasty and along with it all of northern China. The Manchu elite did not concern themselves directly with guns and their production, preferring instead to delegate the task to Chinese craftsmen, who produced for the Qing a similar composite metal cannon known as the "Shenwei grand general." However, after the Qing gained hegemony over East Asia in the mid-1700s, the practice of casting composite metal cannons fell into disuse until the dynasty faced external threats once again in the Opium War of 1840, at which point smoothbore cannons were already starting to become obsolete as a result of rifled barrels. After the Battle of Taku Forts (1860), the British reported with surprise that some of the Chinese cannons were of composite structure with similar features to the Armstrong Whitworth guns. Many of the Qing cannons deployed along the coast were forged in the 17th or early 18th century.

Although the southern Chinese started making cannons with iron cores and bronze outer shells as early as the 1530s, they were followed soon after by the Gujarats, who experimented with it in 1545, the English at least by 1580, and Hollanders in 1629. However the effort required to produce these weapons prevented them from mass production. The Europeans essentially treated them as experimental products, resulting in very few surviving pieces today. Of the currently known extant composite metal cannons, there are 2 English, 2 Dutch, 12 Gujarati, and 48 from the Ming-Qing period.

See also
 Korean cannon
 List of muzzle-loading guns

References

Citations

Bibliography
 .
 

 

Cannon
Artillery of China